Gao Han (born 3 July 1971) is a Chinese former track and field sprinter who competed in the 100 metres. She holds a personal best of 11.26 seconds, set in 1992. Gao was the Chinese national champion in the event in 1992 and won a bronze medal at the 1993 East Asian Games behind Wang Huei-Chen and Xiao Yehua.

She represented China at the 1992 Summer Olympics, reaching the quarter-finals of the women's 100 m and running in the first round of the 4 × 100 metres relay with team mates Tian Yumei, Chen Zhaojing, and Xiao Yehua. Relay gold came later that year for the quartet at the 1992 IAAF World Cup.

International competitions

National titles
Chinese Athletics Championships
100 metres: 1992

References

External links

Living people
1971 births
Chinese female sprinters
Olympic athletes of China
Athletes (track and field) at the 1992 Summer Olympics
Olympic female sprinters
20th-century Chinese women